Manuel Medel (1906 – 1997) was a Mexican film actor. A comedian, during the late 1930s he teamed up with the rising star Cantinflas for three films.

Selected filmography
 Such Is My Country (1937)
 Heads or Tails (1937)
 The Sign of Death (1939)
 The Spectre of the Bride (1943)
 The Headless Woman (1944)
 The Black Ace (1946)
 La vida inútil de Pito Pérez, The Useless Life of Pito Perez (1944)
 Madman and Vagabond (1946)

References

Bibliography
 Mraz, John. Looking for Mexico: Modern Visual Culture and National Identity. Duke University Press, 2010.

External links

1906 births
1997 deaths
Mexican male film actors
Male actors from Monterrey
20th-century Mexican male actors